While black people in Nazi Germany were never subject to an organized mass extermination program, as in the cases of Jews, homosexuals, Romani, and Slavs, they were still considered by the Nazis to be an inferior race and along with Romani people were subject to the Nuremberg Laws under a supplementary decree.

Background
Even before World War II, Germany struggled with the idea of African mixed-race German citizens. While interracial marriage was legal under German law at the time, beginning in 1890, some colonial officials started refusing to register them, using eugenics arguments about the supposed inferiority of mixed-race children to support their decision. By 1912, this had become official policy in many German colonies, and a debate in the Reichstag over the legality of the interracial marriage bans ensued. A major concern brought up in debate was that mixed-race children born in such marriages would have German citizenship, and could therefore return to Germany with the same rights to vote, serve in the military, and could also hold public office as full-blooded ethnic Germans.

After World War I, French occupation forces in the Rhineland included African colonial troops, some of whom fathered children with German women. Newspaper campaigns against the use of these troops focused on these children, dubbed "Rhineland bastards", often with lurid stories of uncivilised African soldiers raping innocent German women, the so-called "Black Horror on the Rhine". In the Rhineland itself, local opinion of the troops was very different, and the soldiers were described as "courteous and often popular", possibly because French colonial soldiers harboured less ill-will towards Germans than war-weary ethnic French occupiers.  While subsequent discussions of Afro-German children revolved around these "Rhineland Bastards", in fact, only 400–600 children were born to such unions, compared to a total Black population of 20,000–25,000 in Germany at the time.

In Mein Kampf, Hitler described children resulting from marriages to African occupation soldiers as a contamination of the white race "by negro blood on the Rhine in the heart of Europe." He thought that "Jews were responsible for bringing Negroes into the Rhineland, with the ultimate idea of bastardising the White race which they hate and thus lowering its cultural and political level so that the Jew might dominate." He also implied that this was a plot on the part of the French since the population of France was being increasingly "negrified".

Rhineland sterilisation program

Under eugenics laws during the Third Reich, race alone was not sufficient criteria for forced sterilisation, but anyone could request sterilisation for themselves or a minor under their care.  The cohort of mixed-race children born during the occupation were approaching adulthood when, in 1937, with Hitler's approval, a special Gestapo commission was created and charged with "the discrete sterilisation of the Rhineland bastards." It is unclear how much these minors were told about the procedures, or how many parents only consented under pressure from the Gestapo.  An estimated 500 children were sterilised under this program, including girls as young as eleven years old.

Civilian life
Beyond the compulsory sterilisation programme in the Rhineland, there was no coherent Nazi policy towards African Germans. In one instance, when local officials petitioned for guidance on how to handle an Afro-German who could not find employment because he was a repeat criminal offender, they were told the population was too small to warrant the formulation of any official policy and to settle the case as they saw fit. Due to the rhetoric at the time, Black Germans experienced discrimination in employment, welfare, and housing, and were also banned from pursuing higher education; they were socially isolated and forbidden to have sexual relations and marriages with Aryans by the racial laws. Black people were placed at the bottom of the racial scale of non-Aryans along with Jews, Slavs, and Romani/Roma people. Some Black people managed to work as actors in films about the African colonies. Others were hired for the German Africa Show, a human zoo touring between 1937–40.

In the armed forces
The Compulsory Service Act of 21 May 1935 restricted military service to "Aryans" only, but there are several documented cases of Afro-Germans who served in the Wehrmacht, or were enlisted in Nazi organizations like the Hitler Youth. 

The Legion of French Volunteers Against Bolshevism (Légion des volontaires français contre le bolchévisme, LVF) sent to the Eastern Front as part of the Wehrmacht initially included some 200 non-white volunteers, originating mainly in French North Africa. An influx of foreign volunteers during the North African campaign also led to the presence of some black people in the Wehrmacht in units like the Free Arabian Legion.

Non-German prisoners of war

The French Army made extensive use of black soldiers during the Battle of France in May–June 1940 and 120,000 became prisoners of war. Although the majority came from France's North African colonies, there were also large numbers from French West Africa and Madagascar. While no orders were issued in regards to black prisoners of war, some German commanders separated black people from captured French units for summary execution on their own initiative. There are also documented cases of captured African American soldiers in the United States Army suffering the same fate.

In the absence of any official policy, the treatment of black prisoners of war varied widely, and most captured black soldiers were taken prisoner rather than executed. However, violence against black prisoners of war was also never prosecuted by Nazi authorities. In prisoner of war camps, black soldiers were kept segregated from white and generally experienced worse conditions than their white comrades. Their conditions deteriorated further in the last days of the war. Roughly half of the French colonial prisoners of war did not survive captivity. Groups such as North Africans were sometimes treated as black, sometimes as white.

References
Notes

Bibliography

 
 
 
 

 
 

Further reading

External links
 "Blacks during the Holocaust" and exhibition for "Black History Month" from the United States Holocaust Memorial Museum
 The fate of blacks in Nazi Germany from Deutsche Welle

Politics of Nazi Germany
African diaspora in Germany
Anti-black racism in Germany
Anti-black racism in Europe